John 'Jocky' Dempster (born 8 October 1948) is a former Scottish professional footballer who played as a right winger, mainly for Queen of the South and also St Mirren and Clyde.

Career 
Dempster played with junior outfit Muirkirk before signing for Queen of the South at the start of the 1969–70 season.

Dempster is best known for his time Queens in Dumfries. The 1970s goalscoring winger and penalty taker found the net 98 times during 355 first-team matches for the Doonhamers and is the sixth highest goalscorer in the club's history. Dempster played alongside teammates Allan Ball, Iain McChesney and Crawford Boyd, who were named amongst the best eleven that Dempster played with at Palmerston Park.

Queens narrowly missed out on promotion in Dempster's first season at Palmerston, the 1968-70 season, as the club finished third in the table behind Falkirk and Cowdenbeath respectively, in Scottish League Division Two.

After leaving Palmerston Park, Dempster played for senior clubs St Mirren and Clyde for a season a-piece, before moving to Scottish Juniors club Cumnock.

References 

1948 births
Living people
Footballers from East Ayrshire
Scottish footballers
Association football wingers
Queen of the South F.C. players
St Mirren F.C. players
Clyde F.C. players
Cumnock Juniors F.C. players
Scottish Football League players
Scottish Junior Football Association players